Mauricio Azevedo Alves (born May 1, 1988), better known as Amaral, is a Brazilian football defensive midfielder who currently plays for Moto Club.

Career

Career statistics
(Correct )

according to combined sources on the Flamengo official website and Flaestatística.

Honours
Flamengo
Copa do Brasil: 2013
Campeonato Carioca: 2014

Vitória
Campeonato Baiano: 2016

References

External links

1988 births
Living people
Brazilian footballers
Association football midfielders
Campeonato Brasileiro Série A players
Campeonato Brasileiro Série B players
CR Flamengo footballers
Nova Iguaçu Futebol Clube players
Quissamã Futebol Clube players
Esporte Clube Vitória players
Boa Esporte Clube players
Centro Sportivo Alagoano players
Moto Club de São Luís players